Răuseni is a commune in Botoșani County, Western Moldavia, Romania. It is composed of five villages: Doina, Pogorăști, Răuseni, Rediu and Stolniceni.

References

Communes in Botoșani County
Localities in Western Moldavia